Gary Busey (born June 29, 1944) is an American actor. He is known for his portrayal of  Buddy Holly in The Buddy Holly Story (1978), for which he was nominated for the Academy Award for Best Actor and won the National Society of Film Critics Award for Best Actor. His other starring roles include A Star is Born (1976), D.C. Cab (1983), Silver Bullet (1985), Lethal Weapon (1987), Predator 2 (1990), Point Break (1991),  Under Siege (1992), Rookie of the Year (1993), The Firm (1993), Black Sheep (1996) and Lost Highway (1997).

Early life
Busey was born in Goose Creek, Texas. While he was in fourth grade, Busey moved from Goose Creek to Tulsa, Oklahoma, where he later attended Bell Junior High School, then attended and graduated from Nathan Hale High School. Busey attended Coffeyville Community College before attending Pittsburg State University in Pittsburg, Kansas, on a football scholarship, where he became interested in acting. After a knee injury, he then transferred to Oklahoma State University in Stillwater, Oklahoma, to study theater. He quit school just one unit short of graduation.

Career

Early career

Busey began his show business career as a drummer in The Rubber Band. He appears on several Leon Russell recordings, credited as playing drums under the name "Teddy Jack Eddy" a character he created when he was a cast member of a local television comedy show in Tulsa, Oklahoma, called The Uncanny Film Festival and Camp Meeting on station KTUL (which starred fellow Tulsan Gailard Sartain as "Dr. Mazeppa Pompazoidi"). For his skits on Uncanny Film Festival, Busey drew on his American Hero, belligerent, know-it-all character. When he told Gailard Sartain his character needed a name, Sartain replied, "Take three: Teddy, Jack and Eddy."

He played in a band called Carp, which released one album on Epic Records in 1969. Busey continued to play several small roles in both film and television during the 1970s. In 1975, as the character "Harvey Daley", he was the last person killed on the series Gunsmoke (in the third-to-last episode, No. 633 – "The Busters").

Rise to prominence

In 1974, Busey made his major film debut with a supporting role in Michael Cimino's buddy action caper Thunderbolt and Lightfoot, starring Clint Eastwood and Jeff Bridges.

In 1976, he was hired by Barbra Streisand and her producer-boyfriend Jon Peters to play Bobby Ritchie, road manager to Kris Kristofferson's character in the remake film A Star is Born. On the DVD commentary of the film, Streisand says Busey was great and that she had seen him on a TV series and thought he had the right qualities to play the role.

In 1978, he starred as rock legend Buddy Holly in The Buddy Holly Story with Sartain as The Big Bopper. For his performance, Busey received the greatest critical acclaim of his career and the movie earned an Academy Award nomination for Best Actor and the National Society of Film Critics' Best Actor award for him. In the same year he also starred in the small yet acclaimed drama Straight Time and the surfing movie Big Wednesday, which is now a minor cult classic.

In the 1980s, Busey's films included the critically acclaimed western Barbarosa, the comedies D.C. Cab and Insignificance, and the Stephen King adaptation Silver Bullet. He played one of the primary antagonists opposite Mel Gibson and Danny Glover in the action comedy Lethal Weapon.

In the 1990s, he had prominent supporting roles in successful action films such as Predator 2, Point Break and Under Siege. He also appeared in Rookie of the Year, The Firm, Black Sheep, Lost Highway, and Fear and Loathing in Las Vegas.

Busey sang the song "Stay All Night" on Saturday Night Live in March 1979 (season 4, episode 14), and on the Late Show with David Letterman in the 1990s.

2000s–present
In 2002, Busey voiced the character Phil Cassidy in the video game Grand Theft Auto: Vice City and later reprises the role in the prequel Grand Theft Auto: Vice City Stories in 2006. He received much praise from critics and fans for his portrayal of the outlandish character.
In 2003, Busey starred in a Comedy Central reality show, I'm with Busey. In 2005, he also voiced himself in an episode of The Simpsons and appeared in the popular miniseries Into the West. Busey controversially appeared in the 2006 Turkish nationalist film Valley of the Wolves: Iraq, which was accused of fascism, anti-Americanism, and antisemitism.

In 2005, Busey starred in the horror film The Gingerdead Man as the titular character and crazed killer Millard Findlemeyer. In 2007, he appeared as himself in a prominent recurring role on HBO's Entourage, in which he parodied his eccentric image, ultimately appearing on three episodes of the show.

In 2008, he joined the second season of the reality show Celebrity Rehab with Dr. Drew. In March 2009, Busey appeared as a roaster at the Comedy Central Roast of Larry the Cable Guy. Busey returned to reality television in Celebrity Apprentice 4, which premiered in March 2011, and appeared again in Celebrity Apprentice 6. There, he briefly reprised his role as Buddy Holly by performing "Not Fade Away".

In a series of 2010 YouTube advertisements for Vitamin Water, Busey appeared as Norman Tugwater, a lawyer who defends professional athletes' entitlements to a cut from Fantasy Football team owners.

In 2014, he became a celebrity spokesperson for Amazon Fire TV. That August, he appeared in, and became the first American winner of Celebrity Big Brother 14.

On September 1, 2015, it was announced that he would be competing on the 21st season of Dancing with the Stars. He was paired with professional dancer Anna Trebunskaya. Busey and Trebunskaya made it to Week 4 of competition but were then eliminated and finished in 10th place.

On June 17, 2019, he was announced to star as God in the Off-Broadway musical Only Human at the Theatre at St. Clements in New York. The production was scheduled to begin performances on October 8, 2019, and officially on open October 21. The plot of Only Human is described as follows: "Before they were enemies, they were co-workers. Jesus and Lucifer never saw eye-to-eye, but when an extreme case of creative differences gets the best of them, all hell breaks loose. Literally." In a statement on playing God in the upcoming production, he said, "God is everything love is and that love becomes the beginning of blessings and miracles. Playing this role of God is easy because I'm not acting, I'm just believing."
In May 2020, the first season of Gary Busey Pet Judge was released in which Busey presides as a pet court show judge to help resolve problems.

Personal life

Busey has three children, Jake, Alectra, and Luke.

On December 4, 1988, Busey was severely injured in a motorcycle accident in which he was not wearing a helmet. His skull was fractured, and he suffered permanent brain damage.

In 1996, Busey publicly announced that he was a Christian, saying: "I am proud to tell Hollywood I am a Christian. For the first time I am now free to be myself." Busey cites the motorcycle accident, as well as a 1995 cocaine overdose as events that strengthened his Christian faith.

In 1997, Busey underwent successful surgery to remove a cancerous, plum-sized tumor from his sinus cavity. The growth was found after Busey began suffering nose bleeds.

During the filming of the second season of Celebrity Rehab in 2008, Busey was referred to psychiatrist Charles Sophy. Sophy suspected that Busey's brain injury has had a greater effect on him than was realized. He described it as essentially weakening his mental "filters" and causing him to speak and act impulsively. Sophy recommended Busey take valproic acid (Depakote), with which Busey agreed.

In 2011, Busey endorsed Newt Gingrich during Gingrich's 2012 presidential campaign, but later withdrew his endorsement. In 2015, he endorsed Donald Trump for the 2016 United States Presidential election. After the election, Busey stated that he was "very happy" that Trump won, but declined to further discuss it, not wishing to talk about politics.

Sexual misconduct allegations

On August 19, 2022, Busey was arrested and charged with three sexual offenses and one count of harassment at Monster-Mania Con in Cherry Hill, New Jersey, where he was a featured guest. The Cherry Hill police said they had received multiple complaints about Busey's conduct and that "It was about contact. It was about touching."

Filmography

Selected filmography

 Wild in the Streets (1968)
 Angels Hard as They Come (1971)
 The Magnificent Seven Ride! (1972)
 Dirty Little Billy (1972)
 The Last American Hero (1973)
 Hex (1973)
 Thunderbolt and Lightfoot (1974)
 The Gumball Rally (1976)
 A Star Is Born  (1976)
 Straight Time (1978)
 The Buddy Holly Story (1978)
 Big Wednesday (1978)
 Carny (1980)
 Foolin' Around (1980)
 Barbarosa (1982)
 D.C. Cab (1983)
 Insignificance (1985)
 Silver Bullet (1985)
 Eye of the Tiger (1986)
 Lethal Weapon (1987)
 Predator 2 (1990)
 Point Break (1991)
 Under Siege (1992)
 The Firm (1993)
 Rookie of the Year (1993)
 Surviving the Game (1994)
 Drop Zone (1994)
 Black Sheep (1996)
 Lost Highway (1997)
 Soldier (1998)
 Fear and Loathing in Las Vegas (1998)
 Hot Boyz (1999)
 Quigley (2003)
 Piranha 3DD (2012)
 Entourage (2015)

Awards and nominations

References

External links

 
 

Living people
20th-century American male actors
21st-century American male actors
American Christians
American male film actors
American male stage actors
American male television actors
American male voice actors
BAFTA winners (people)
California Republicans
Coffeyville Community College alumni
Epic Records artists
Male actors from Oklahoma
Male actors from Texas
Participants in American reality television series
People from Baytown, Texas
People with traumatic brain injuries
Pittsburg State University alumni
Reality show winners
The Apprentice (franchise) contestants
1944 births